Back of the Y (also known as Back of the Y TV during series 1 and Back of the Y Masterpiece Television during series 2), is a cult New Zealand television series, created by Chris Stapp and Matt Heath. The show glorified stunts and the consumption of copious amounts of alcohol, and took its name from the Hollywood special episode, which featured Randy Campbell jumping off the back of the "Y" of the famous Hollywood Sign.

Cast
Matt Heath as Danny Parker / Dick Johansonson
Chris Stapp as Randy Cambell
Phil Bruff as Spanners Watson
Grubby as Prof. "Crash" Endicott
Chris Winn as Wally Symons
Matt Perkins as Skip Butler
Piers Graham as Ray Smoodiver
Melissa Goodfellow as Cindy Cockburn
Emma Savonije as Communications Officer

Concept and history
Back of the Y is centred on a mock live TV show, featuring segments such as "Randy Campbell's Extreme Stunts" and "Cunstables". The show was low budget, and apparently filmed with amateur equipment and edited on home computers. A description of the show at the start of the first episode established the premise for the show, with reference to one of the characters: "Phil Bruff had a dream. To make a New Zealand TV show that wasn't complete shit. He failed... Miserably!!!"

The second series consisted of seven episodes of Back of the Y Masterpiece Television and The Back of the Y Goes to Hollywood Special (2002).

In addition to New Zealand, the show was broadcast on MTV2 in the UK and on Channel V in Australia.

Back of the Y features the New Zealand band Deja Voodoo, originally a fictional house band. After Back of the Y Stapp and Heath developed Deja Voodoo into a real band.

In 2007, Stapp and Heath released The Devil Dared Me To (The Randy Campbell Story), backed by Headstrong Productions, in association with the New Zealand Film Commission. The film tells the story of Randy Campbell, Back of the Ys Stuntman character, and how he rose to become "the world's greatest stuntman". The film stars Chris Stapp as the titular Randy Campbell, and Matt Heath as Dick Johansonson as well as an all-New Zealand cast.

Back of the Y began shooting a third series from 24 September 2007 to 28 September 2007 at Henderson Valley Studios in Auckland.

The third series of the show was aired on C4 in New Zealand from 26 May 2008, it's made up of six episodes and a making-of special.

Regular features
 "Vaseline Warriors": a Mad Max parody set in a post-apocalyptic future where all women have been destroyed, and men fight over ripped up pornographic magazines and vaseline.
 "Bottlestore Galactica": a Battlestar Galactica parody. Space pilots Steineken and Heinlager get drunk and fly around the galaxy. Most episodes centred on drinking copious amounts of alcohol and the viewer observing the effects.
 "Ass/Off": a parody of Face/Off
 "Poo Man and Wees": a scatological Batman and Robin parody. Poo Man and his sidekick Wees fight against distasteful characters such as Scatwoman and the Shitty Mummy. Episodes usually end with multiple characters ingesting faeces and/or urine.
 "The Fart Tycoon": a recurring skit about a flatulent millionaire, whose good-hearted attempts at philanthropy are thwarted by his gaseous outbursts.

Episodes

Series 2

Special (2002)

Special (2005)

Series 3

Releases
 Complete Artswholes - A video cassette no longer available to the general public, this video contains every single second of Artswhole to ever be aired on the television show Space, including an episode that was banned.
 Back of the Y 2002 Annual - a book containing jokes, stories, pictures and comics. Only 10 copies were made.
 Back of the Y Masterpiece Television Series One (VHS) - a video containing the six episodes that played on Channel 2 in 2001.
 Back of the Y: The Two DVDs - contains all seven episodes of series one, and a number of bonus features.

References

External links
 Official Back Of The Y website
 Back of the Y C4 website
 Back of the Y videos at NZ On Screen
 

2000s New Zealand television series
2001 New Zealand television series debuts
2001 New Zealand television series endings
2008 New Zealand television series debuts
2008 New Zealand television series endings
C4 (New Zealand TV channel) original programming
New Zealand comedy television series
Television shows filmed in New Zealand
Television shows funded by NZ on Air
TVNZ 2 original programming